Kuiu Island is an island in the Alexander Archipelago in southeastern Alaska. It lies between Kupreanof Island, to its east, and Baranof Island, to its west. It is nearly cut in two by Affleck Canal. It has  of land area, making it the 15th largest island in the United States. The entire island is part of Tongass National Forest. The population was 10 persons at the 2000 census. It is separated from Baranof Island by Chatham Strait.

The Cape Decision Light is located on Kuiu Island. Also on the island are the Kuiu Wilderness and the Tebenkof Bay Wilderness areas.

History
The island was first charted by Joseph Whidbey and James Johnstone, two of George Vancouver's men during his 1791-95 expedition, in 1793–94. The latter, Johnstone, proved its insularity.

References

Image gallery

Sources
Kuiu Island: Blocks 1054 thru 1061 and 1071 thru 1072, Census Tract 1, Wrangell-Petersburg Census Area, Alaska United States Census Bureau

Islands of the Alexander Archipelago
Islands of Prince of Wales–Hyder Census Area, Alaska
Islands of Alaska